Rudolf Thalhammer (born February 1, 1935) was a former Grand Prix motorcycle road racer from Austria. His best year was in 1961 when he finished sixth in the 350cc world championship. He was a three-time Austrian national champion.

References 

1935 births
Austrian motorcycle racers
250cc World Championship riders
350cc World Championship riders
Isle of Man TT riders
Living people